Chief of Joint Operations may refer to:
Chief of Joint Operations (Australia) (CJOPS)
Chief of Joint Operations (Sweden) (CJO)
Chief of Joint Operations (United Kingdom) (CJO)
 Chief of Joint Operations, who directs the South African Joint Operations Division